Langley Steinert (born 1963) is an American entrepreneur and business executive. He is most notable for being a founder of CarGurus and being a co-founder Tripadvisor along with Stephen Kaufer.

Steinert has been estimated to have a Net worth of US$522 million as of 2021.

Education 
Steinert attended Georgetown University from 1981 until 1985, finishing with a Bachelor's degree in Economics. From 1989 until 1991 he attended Tuck School of Business earning his Master of Business Administration.

Business career

Early career 
After graduating from business school, Steinert spent three years from 1991 until 1994 as a product manager at the now defunct Lotus Software. After his stay at Lotus, he later spent three years at Papyrus and then spent another two years at Viaweb, joining as the fifth employee of the company. Steinert then became a partner at the venture capital company Flagship Pioneering (then Flagship Ventures), where he then met Stephen Kaufer, who he would later co-found Tripadvisor with.

Tripadvisor 

Steinert along with Kaufer, raised US$4.5 million from family and friends to later found their company Tripadvisor, a company that utilizes user-generated reviews for places such as Hotels, Museums and Restaurants, in February 2000. In an interview with Inc., Steinert stated that "this became bigger than I'd envisioned" when asked about his success at Tripadvisor. He later stepped down as Chairman of the company in February 2006 to found his new company CarGurus.

CarGurus 

Steinert founded the company CarGurus, a company that assists users in comparing local listings for used and new cars, and contacting sellers, in January 2006. Steinert served as CEO of the company until 2021, when he stepped down, replacing him with Jason Trevisan.

ApartmentAdvisor 
Along with Josh Arnold and Oliver Chrzan, he founded the company ApartmentAdvisor, which is based on finding "apartments that offer the best value for the money", in 2021.

References 

Business executives
Businesspeople from Massachusetts
Tuck School of Business alumni
Georgetown College (Georgetown University) alumni
Living people
1965 births